Matāafa is one of the four paramount tama-a-aiga (maximal lineage) titles of Samoa. It is one of two such titles originating from the Atua district at the east end of Upolu island (the other being Tupua Tamasese of Falefa & Salani) and has its historical seat in the village of Amaile. Prominent holders of the title include Matā'afa Iosefo of Falefa, one of the three rival candidates for the kingship of Samoa during the early colonial period, Matāafa Faumuina Fiame Mulinuu I (died 1948) of Lepea and Lotofaga, who became leader of Samoa's pro-independence Mau movement after Tupua Tamasese Lealofi III's assassination; and his son Fiame Matāafa Faumuina Mulinuu II (1921–1975), the first Prime Minister of Samoa.

The title was then passed on to Matāafa Faasuamaleaui Puela Patu. After his death in 1997, the title fell vacant until 2011, when it was granted to Matāafa Tupuola Lui Iosefo. Following his death in 2014, the title again became vacant and remains so to this day.

Origins of the Matāafa 
The beginnings of the tama-a-aiga Matāafa lineage is traced through to Queen Salamasina. Her granddaughter Taufau sired Tupuivao who founded the line which resides in Amaile. The lineage branches off in later years with the title's ancestor Luafalemana, the son of King Tupua Fuiavailili and Punipuao, daughter of Alai'asā of Falefa.  Luafalemana married Gese and together had a daughter, Salaina'oloa. Having been issued and raised by 'Aiga Sā Fenunuivao (descendants of Fenunuivao), she married Tuimavave (also known as Tauili'ili) of 'Aiga Sā Levālasi (descendants of Levalasi). The union of these two lines issued the first line of the Matā'afa titleholders, Fa'asuamale'aui, in 1785. Tuimavave's other union with Letelesā issued another line of the title, Silupevailei. Both Fa'asuamale'aui and Silupevailei are the two lines of descent from whom the Matā'afa is selected.

Tuimavave's union with King Tupua's grand-daughter, Salaina'oloa, has resulted in the Matā'afa titles' close association with the other tama-a-aiga title, Tupua Tamasese and the aloali’i title Luafalemana of Falefa. This has at times, resulted in Matā'afa holders also holding the Tupua title concurrently, like Matā'afa Iosefo, who became known as Tupua Matā'afa Iosefo. By joining the daughter of Luafalemana with Tuimavave, the Tui Atua line arrives at a harmonious junction between the two great families of Atua - 'Aiga Sā Levālasi  (custodian of the Matā'afa title) and '''Aiga Sā Fenunuivao (custodian of the Tupua Tamasese title).

Family traditions differ as to who was the first Matāafa, but the majority of opinions favour either Filifilisounuu, son of Faasuamaleaui or Tafagamanu, son of Filifilisounuu. Either way, it is the line of Faasuamaleaui that began and carried the title from its inception until 1948, when the title passed to the Silupevailei line. After subsequent appeals before the Lands & Titles Court, the title returned to Faasuamaleaui's line upon the death of former Prime Minister Fiame Matāafa Faumuina Mulinuu II, when it was bestowed on Matā'afa Puela Faasuamaleaui Patu who held it until his passing in 1997.  Mata‘afa Tupuola Lui Iosefo succeeded to the mantle until his passing in 2014. The title remains vacant to this day.

 Authority 
Like the Tupua Tamasese title, the Matāafa titleholder is selected by its primary political family and heirs. The title is held in custodianship by the Aiga Sā Mata’afa, among whom are the Aiga Sā Tago as well as the Aiga Sā Levalasi, named after Levalasi, Queen Salamasina's adoptive mother. 

Ownership of the title was confirmed in 1939, where it was decided that Aiga Sā Levālasi would select who would hold the Matā'afa title from the heirs at Anapapa, the Matā'afa's appurtenant maota (seat of residence) in the village of Amaile. Once they have made their selection, the Aiga Sa Tago are informed. The Aiga's main branches are in Amaile and Lotofaga as well as the family Satago. The head of Aiga Sā Levālasi is the Fiame titleholder of Lotofaga, currently held by Samoa's Prime Minister, Fiame Naomi Matāafa.

Title holders
Holders of the Matā'afa title include;

Matā'afa Iosefo (1832–1912), a rival for the 'kingship' of Samoa during the country's colonial era.
Matā'afa Tupuola Iose (1912–1915)
Matā'afa Muliufi (1915–1936), a member of the Legislative Council
The title then passed to the Silupevailei line to Matā'afa Faumuina Fiame Mulinu'u I (died 1948), a leader of Samoa's pro-independence Mau movement.
Was married to a daughter of the other tama-a-'aiga'', Malietoa Laupepa.
Fiame Matā'afa Faumuina Mulinu'u II (1921–1975), son of Matā'afa Faumuina Fiame Mulinu'u I. First Prime Minister of Samoa.
Was married to Laulu Fetauimalemau Matā'afa (1928–2007).
Their daughter Hon. Fiame Naomi Matā'afa, is the current high chief of Lotofaga, and the first Female Prime Minister of Samoa since 2021.
The title was then passed back to the Faasuamale'aui line to Matā'afa Puela Faasuamaleaui Patu until his passing in 1997. 
The title then passed to Matāafa Tupuola Lui Iosefo in 2011, until his death in 2014. The title remains vacant today.

Gallery

See also

Fa'amatai, chieflty system of Samoa.
Muagututi'a
Malietoa
Tuimaleali'ifano
Tupua Tamasese
Tui Manu'a
German Samoa
History of Samoa
Politics of Samoa

References

History of Samoa
Politics of Samoa
Samoan chiefs